The Ministry of Youth Development, Indigenisation and Economic Empowerment is a government ministry, responsible for youth issues and economic empowerment in Zimbabwe. The incumbent minister is Sithembiso Nyoni, who also leads the Ministry for Women's affairs

List of ministers 

{| class="wikitable"
!Name
!Term start
!Term end
!Party
|-
|Saviour Kasukuwere
|13 February 2009
|11 September 2013
|ZANU–PF
|-
|Francis Nhema
|11 September 2013
|11 December 2014
|ZANU–PF
|-
|Christopher Mushohwe
|11 December 2014
|11 September 2015
|ZANU–PF
|-
|Patrick Zhuwao
|11 September 2015
|9 October 2017
|ZANU–PF
|-
|Chiratidzo Mabuwa
|9 October 2017
|27 November 2017
|ZANU–PF
|-
|Sithembiso Nyoni
|30 November 2017
|Incumbent
|ZANU-PF
|-
|Gideon Bonde
|14 February 20221
|Incumbent
|ZANU-PF

References

Government of Zimbabwe
Society of Zimbabwe